Leatrice "Elle" McKinney, better known by her pen name L.L. McKinney, is an American writer of young adult literature. Her debut novel, A Blade So Black, was released in September 2018. McKinney created the PublishingPaidMe Twitter hashtag in June 2020 to highlight racial disparities in writers' advance payments.

Career 
McKinney enjoyed reading and writing from childhood. She studied video game design in college and went on to work at Hallmark as a greeting card writer. She held the position after the publication of her first book.

McKinney published her debut novel A Blade So Black in fall 2018. The book is the first in the Nightmare-Verse series and is a contemporary retelling of Alice's Adventures in Wonderland with a Black teenage girl protagonist. The second in the series, A Dream So Dark was released in September 2019, and the third, A Crown So Cursed, is slated for 2023 release.

In May 2020 she announced her forthcoming YA novel and first graphic novel, Nubia: Real One. It is a coming-of-age story about a Black girl with superhuman strength, and is an iteration of the character Nubia who debuted in Wonder Woman in 1976 as the DC Universe's first Black woman superhero. The book was released by DC in February 2021.

Twitter activity 
McKinney is an active member of the YA Twitterverse. In early 2019 McKinney was one of several writers who used Twitter to criticize the planned publication of Blood Heir by Amélie Wen Zhao due to its treatment of the book's African American characters.

In February 2020, she used her account to protest Barnes & Noble's Diverse Edition collection, an initiative introduced for Black History Month featuring covers of classic books re-printed with people of color as the protagonists, including books like Frankenstein and Peter Pan. She referred to the campaign as "literary blackface" and recommended that the bookstore instead release classic Black literature with updated covers. The store cancelled the campaign in response to the criticism.

On June 6, 2020 McKinney created the hashtag #PublishingPaidMe for writers to share their advance payments from publishing contracts, and in particular to highlight racial disparities between Black and white writers. She developed the hashtag in concert with the worldwide protests related to institutional racism that took place after the murder of George Floyd. McKinney was inspired by a Tweet from YA author Tochi Onyebuchi asking writers to share advance information for the sake of transparency. A spreadsheet was also created based on survey data collected by McKinney through Twitter, which amounted to over 1,200 entries. The data showed that Black writers often receive far lower advances compared to white writers, even after winning major awards, such as N. K. Jemisin.

Personal life 
McKinney resides in Kansas City, Kansas.

Works 
A Blade So Black. 2018. Imprint/Macmillan, publication date 25 September 2018. 
 A Dream So Dark. 2019. Imprint/Macmillan, publication date 24 September 2019. 
 Nubia: Real One. 2021. DC Comics, publication date 23 February 2021.

Awards and nominations 

 Nubia: Real One, DC Comics, 2021 - 2022 Ignyte Award Finalist for Best Comics Team
 Winner 2021 The Community Award for Outstanding Efforts in Service of Inclusion and Equitable Practice in Genre, presented by the Ignyte Awards, for #PublishingPaidMe, with Tochi Onyebuchi

References

External links 
 Official website

Year of birth missing (living people)
Living people
21st-century American women writers
Women writers of young adult literature
American writers of young adult literature
21st-century African-American women writers
21st-century African-American writers
American graphic novelists
African-American novelists